Swan Lake is an alpine freshwater lake located within the Alpine Lakes Wilderness in a valley on the northern slope of Keechelus Ridge in Kittitas County, Washington, United States. Because of its close proximity to Rampart Ridge, Interstate 90 and several cirque on both sides of Keechelus Ridge, the lake is a common area for hiking, swimming, and fishing cutthroat trout. Keechelus Ridge is accessed through trail 4934 which covers the length of the ridge. Swan Lakes is between Keechelus Lake on the West and Kachess Lake further East.

Location  
Swan Lake sits on the north aspect of the valley it shares with Rock Rabbit Lakes. Stonesthrow Lake is on the north ridge of the valley, with Margaret Lake a short distance west at the skirt of Mount Margaret.

Flora 
Major flora growing within the lake and prominent in the summer months include huckleberry bushes and wildflowers such as bear grass, lupins, paintbrush lilies, tiger lilies, and fireweed.

See also 
 List of lakes of the Alpine Lakes Wilderness

External links 
 Swan / Rock Rabbit / Stonestrow Lakes Illustration of roads and trails to Swan Lakes and surroundings on the Washington Trails Association site.

References 

Lakes of Kittitas County, Washington
Lakes of the Alpine Lakes Wilderness
Okanogan National Forest